Fathi Ali Khorshid (11 December 1937 – 15 June 2018) was an Egyptian footballer. He competed at the 1960 Summer Olympics and the 1964 Summer Olympics.

References

External links
 

1937 births
2018 deaths
Egyptian footballers
Egypt international footballers
Olympic footballers of Egypt
Footballers at the 1960 Summer Olympics
Footballers at the 1964 Summer Olympics
People from El Mahalla El Kubra
Association football goalkeepers